Rick Leach and Jonathan Stark defeated Mahesh Bhupathi and Leander Paes in the final, 6–3, 6–4, 7–6(7–3) to win the doubles tennis title at the 1997 ATP Tour World Championships.

Mark Woodforde and Todd Woodbridge were the defending champions, but were eliminated in the round-robin stage.

Seeds

Draw

Finals

Green group
Standings are determined by: 1. number of wins; 2. number of matches; 3. in two-players-ties, head-to-head records; 4. in three-players-ties, percentage of sets won, or of games won; 5. steering-committee decision.

Yellow group
Standings are determined by: 1. number of wins; 2. number of matches; 3. in two-players-ties, head-to-head records; 4. in three-players-ties, percentage of sets won, or of games won; 5. steering-committee decision.

External links
Finals Draw
Round robin Draw (Green Group)
Round robin Draw (Yellow Group)

Doubles

1997 in American tennis
Tennis tournaments in the United States
Sports in Hartford, Connecticut
Sports competitions in Hartford, Connecticut
ATP Tour World